Aleksandr Petrovich Filimonov (14 September 1866 – 4 August 1948) was an Ataman of the Kuban People's Republic in 1917–1919.

On 25 October 1917, he was elected Ataman. In December, in an effort to counter Bolshevism in the Kuban, Filimonov supported the formation of two volunteer units, one under Galaev and another under Viktor Pokrovsky.  

He and his Kuban Cossacks joined the White Army during the Russian Civil War, but after disagreements with Anton Denikin, he stepped down as Ataman in December 1919, and emigrated to Yugoslavia.

References 

History of Kuban
1866 births
1948 deaths
Russian anti-communists
Atamans